The 12013/12014 Amritsar Shatabdi Express is a Superfast Express train of Shatabdi class belonging to Indian Railways that runs between Amritsar Junction and New Delhi in India. It is a daily service.

It operates as train number 12013 from New Delhi to Amritsar Junction and as train number 12014 in the reverse direction.

Coaches

The Amritsar Shatabdi Express generally has 1 AC Anubhuti coach, 1 AC 1st Class coach, 14 AC Chair Car coaches, two luggage cum generator coaches. The train runs with the Linke-Hofmann Busch (LHB) coaches.

As with most train services in India, Coach Composition may be amended at the discretion of Indian Railways depending on demand.

The coaches in Light blue color indicate AC Chair Cars and the coaches in Violet color indicate Executive and Anubhuti Classes.

Service

It is the fastest train on the Delhi – Amritsar sector. It has 2 sister trains 12029/30 New Delhi–Amritsar Swarna Shatabdi Express & 12031/32 New Delhi–Amritsar Shatabdi Express. It covers the distance of 448 kilometres in 6 hours 15 mins as 12013 Shatabdi Express (73.64 km/hr) & 6 hours 15 mins as 12014 Shatabdi Express (71.68 km/hr).

There is no pantry car but catering is arranged on board the train & catering charges are included in the fare.

Schedule 
The schedule of this 12013/12014 New Delhi - Amritsar Shatabdi Express is given below:-

Loco link

As the route is fully electrified, a Ghaziabad based WAP 5 or WAP 7 locomotive powers the train for the entire journey.

Routeing

The 12013/14 Amritsar Shatabdi Express runs via Jalandhar , Ludhiana Junction, Ambala Cantonment to New Delhi.

It has 6 halts. Beas Junction, Jalandhar City junction, Phagwara Junction, Ludhiana Junction, Sirhind Junction, Ambala Cantt Junction. (Asr jn - Ndls )

External links

References 

Shatabdi Express trains
Transport in Delhi
Rail transport in Haryana
Rail transport in Delhi
Rail transport in Punjab, India
Rail transport in Gujarat
Rail transport in Rajasthan
Transport in Amritsar